Teddybears is a British children's television programme broadcast on ITV from early 1998 to 2000, based on the books by Susanna Gretz. The show was about the life of five coloured teddy bears and their dog Fred. The show was filmed by Meridian Broadcasting. Journalists have compared Teddybears as being similar to and a rival of Teletubbies which was also produced around that time. However the series was targeted at older children.

History
Teddybears is based on Susanna Gretz and Alison Sage's teddy bear books, the first of which was published almost 30 years before the TV programme's creation. Teddybears inaugural season began on 5 January 1998.

A 1999 article in the Bristol Post said Teddybears "have become a huge hit with young viewers", having captured 64% of the target audience. Link Licensing, a United News & Media spinoff, began making toys, books, and other merchandising several months before the programme's debut. Rights and merchandising company ProVen Private Equity has from Link Licensing the rights to make Teddybears products. In 2000, Link Licensing sold the rights to Teddybears to the TV network Trio which bought 26 episodes.

Comparison with Teletubbies
The producers of Teddybears asserted that Teddybears is not an immediate rival of Teletubbies; the Daily Record considers it a rival. The Daily Record noted that the two TV series have several parallels. Whereas the Teddybears eat "hot cross buns, honey, pancakes, jelly and ice cream", the Teletubbies eat "tubby toast and tubby custard". The Teddybears sing The Teddybear Song while the Teletubbies sing Teletubbies say "Eh-oh!". A difference between the two TV series is that Teddybearss intended audience is older children.

The shows' similarities sparked "intense" coverage by the media. Newspapers and TV shows requested interviews with the teddybears, who all appeared on Richard and Judy's This Morning.

Characters 
The five teddybears in the series are William, Sarah, Louise, Robert, and Charles. They wear "brightly-coloured furry suits" and live at No. 8 Green Street, Bearbridge. According to actress Louise Conran, who played Sarah, she had to "wear a lycra body suit, padding on top of that and then the costumes which are about half an inch thick". Since the teddybear masks were fastened to their faces with glue, the teddybear actors had to keep the masks on the entire day, even when eating dinner. From the second series the costumes were changed because of this. The actors are adults but play child-sized bears on a set in which everything they interact with is oversized.

 Robert, the youngest of the bears, yellow. Often seen with his best friend, a toy frog called Phillip.
 Louise, green. The cheekiest of all the bears.
 Charles, black. The oldest of the bears, wise but very stubborn.
 William, red. Loves to cook.
 Sarah, orange. Plays the mother role. Stokenchurch actress Louise Conran played the role. She heard of the role while she was a maid on the BBC adaption of The Children of the New Forest from the TV film's assistant director who was a friend of Kate Marlow, Teddybears producer.
 Fred, the Dalmatian

Puppeteers Cheryl Blaize, Louise Conran, Tim Hulse, James O' Donnell, Carl Matthewman, John Tobias, Sarah Jane Honeywell, Rae Grant, Grant Mason, Simon Snellings, Kathy Ryan, Rebecca Clow, and Lee Crowley all worked on the series.

Video and DVD

 Teddybears: Circus and other stories (VHS released 1999, DVD released 2003)
 Teddybears: And The Garden Party and other stories (VHS released 1998, DVD released 2004)
 Teddybears: And The Surprise Party and other stories (VHS released, 1999, DVD 2005)
 Teddybears: And The Giant Tomato and other stories (VHS released 2000, DVD 2006)

References

External links
 "Teddy Bears Moving Day", 5 January 1998, the first episode of Teddybears from ITN
 "Teddybears and the Trip to the Moon", 12 January 1998, another episode of Teddybears from ITN

1998 British television series debuts
1999 British television series endings
1990s British children's television series
British children's comedy television series
ITV children's television shows
Television series about bears
British television shows featuring puppetry
Fictional teddy bears
Television series by ITV Studios
Television series by Universal Television
Television shows produced by Meridian Broadcasting
English-language television shows